Andrei Nikolayev may refer to:

 Andrei Nikolayev (clown) (born 1938), Russian clown
 Andrei Ivanovich Nikolayev (born 1949), Major General in the Russian 1st Guards Army
 Andrei Sergeyevich Nikolayev (born 1976), Russian footballer 
 Andrei Aleksandrovich Nikolayev (born 1982), Russian footballer 
 Andrei Nikolaev (swimmer) (born 2000), Russian Paralympic swimmer
 Andrey Nikoleav, son of Russian billionaire Konstantin Nikolaev, was a volunteer on Donald Trump's 2016 campaign staff